"Crazy Beat" is a 1963 song by Gene Vincent, written by J. Fallin and J. Rhodes. The track came out of Vincent's Hollywood sessions produced by Jimmie Haskell and featured a young Ritchie Blackmore on guitar. Capitol Records issued the single in June 1963 after withdrawing the single originally scheduled, "Rip It Up." The single was issued as title track on the 1963 album The Crazy Beat of Gene Vincent.

References

1963 songs
Gene Vincent songs
Songs written by Jack Rhodes